Burnley Barracks railway station is in Burnley, England, on the East Lancashire Line  west of Burnley Central railway station. Following the singling of the track in December 1986, Burnley Barracks has one platform in use, with only a basic shelter in place, and no other buildings on the platform.

It is unstaffed, and one of four request stops on the line (see below), it does though have passenger information screens and timetable boards available, along with a long line PA system to provide train running information.

Services
On weekdays, there is an hourly service from Burnley Barracks to Colne (eastbound) Preston (westbound). On Sundays, there is a two-hourly service in each direction.

From 14 May 2012, Barracks became a request stop, in addition to Hapton, Huncoat and Pleasington.

History

The station opened on 18 September 1848, as a temporary terminus for the East Lancashire Railway whilst an extension was built between Accrington and Colne. It closed four months later when the Colne extension opened. However, the surrounding area developed quickly with industry, housing and the local barracks, which led to the station being reopened under its current name in 1851.

Extensive demolition of the nearby high density Victorian terraced residential areas of Trinity, Westgate and Whittlefield during the 1960s and 70s, together with the construction of the M65 motorway and feeder roads during the early 1980s led to a significant decline in population in the area and thus the station's prominence waned. The barracks themselves (latterly home to the East Lancashire Regiment) have been closed since December 1898 and the site subsequently sold off.

New housing developments north of the M65 (and linked to the station by a footbridge) have recently seen significantly higher usage. Previous fluctuations in usage figures are due to the re-allocation of ticket sales to the various "Burnley Stations Group." (see right)

It was one of the stations featured in the Channel 4 documentary series Paul Merton's Secret Stations in the spring of 2016.

Possible Closure

Should the Skipton-Colne rail link reopen and the existing East Lancashire Line modernised then Burnley Barracks would close to passengers.

References

External links

Railway stations in Burnley
DfT Category F2 stations
Former Lancashire and Yorkshire Railway stations
Railway stations in Great Britain opened in 1848
Northern franchise railway stations
Railway request stops in Great Britain
1848 establishments in England